Seljuk architecture comprises the building traditions that developed under the Seljuk dynasty, when it ruled most of the Middle East and Anatolia during the 11th to 13th centuries. The Great Seljuk Empire (11th-12th centuries) contributed significantly to the architecture of Iran and surrounding regions, introducing innovations such as the symmetrical four-iwan layout and the first widespread creation of state-sponsored madrasas. Their buildings were generally constructed in brick, with decoration created using brickwork, tiles, and carved stucco.

After the 11th century the Seljuks of Anatolia emerged from the Great Seljuk Empire, along with various local dynasties, developing their own architecture. Anatolian Seljuk architecture was more eclectic and was influenced by multiple traditions including Armenian, Byzantine Iranian, and Syrian architecture. Unlike earlier Seljuk architecture to the east, their buildings were generally constructed in stone and featured significant stone-carved decoration as well as tile decoration. While the Seljuk Sultanate declined and ended in the late 13th century, architecture continued to flourish and diversify under the smaller Beylik states in Anatolia, which included the early Ottomans.

Historical background

Great Seljuks 
The Seljuk Turks created the Great Seljuk Empire in the 11th century, conquering all of Iran and other extensive territories from the Hindu Kush to eastern Anatolia and from Central Asia to the Persian Gulf. In 1050 Isfahan was established as capital of the Great Seljuk Empire under Alp Arslan. In 1071, following the Seljuk victory over the Byzantine Empire at the Battle of Manzikert, Anatolia was opened up to Turkic settlers. The center of Seljuk architectural patronage was Iran, where the first permanent Seljuk edifices were constructed. The cultural apogee of the Great Seljuk state is associated with the reign of Malik-Shah I (r. 1072–1092) and the tenure of Nizam al-Mulk as his vizier. Among other policies, Nizam al-Mulk championed Sunnism over Shiism and founded a network of madrasas as an instrument for this policy. This marked the beginning of the madrasa as an institution that spread across the Sunni Islamic world. Although no Seljuk madrasas have been preserved intact today, the architectural design of Seljuk madrasas in Iran likely influenced the design of madrasas elsewhere.

While the apogee of the Great Seljuks was short-lived, it represents a major benchmark in the history of Islamic art and architecture in the region of Greater Iran, inaugurating an expansion of patronage and of artistic forms. Much of the Seljuk architectural heritage was destroyed as a result of the Mongol invasions in the 13th century. Nonetheless, compared to pre-Seljuk Iran, a much greater volume of surviving monuments and artifacts from the Seljuk period has allowed scholars to study the arts of this era in much greater depth than preceding periods. The period of the 11th to 13th centuries is also considered a "classical era" of Central Asian architecture, marked by a high quality of construction and decoration. Here the Seljuk capital was Merv, which remained the artistic center of the region during this period. The region of Transoxiana, north of the Oxus, was ruled by the Qarakhanids, a rival Turkic dynasty who became vassals of the Seljuks during Malik-Shah's reign. This dynasty also contributed to the flourishing of architecture in Central Asia at this time, building in a style very similar to the Seljuks. Similarly, to the east of the Great Seljuk Empire the Ghaznavids and their successors, the Ghurids, built in a closely related style. A general tradition of architecture was thus shared across most of the eastern Islamic world (Iran, Central Asia, and parts of the northern Indian subcontinent) throughout the Seljuk period and its decline, from the 11th to 13th centuries.

Seljuk Anatolia 
After the decline of the Great Seljuks in the late 12th century various Turkic dynasties formed smaller states and empires. A branch of the Seljuk dynasty ruled a Sultanate in Anatolia (also known as the Anatolian Seljuks or Seljuks of Rum), the Zengids and Artuqids ruled in Northern Mesopotomia (known as the Jazira) and nearby regions, and the Khwarazmian Empire ruled over Iran and Central Asia until the Mongol invasions of the 13th century. In addition to the Anatolian Seljuks, with their capital at Konya, other local dynasties and principalities existed across Anatolia such as the Danishmendids at Kayseri and Sivas, the Saltuqids at Erzurum, and the Mengujekids in Divriği and Erzincan. During the second half of the 12th century and the beginning of the 13th century these other principalities were progressively conquered or assimilated by the Seljuks of Konya. The Danishmendid realm was annexed in 1178, the Saltuqid realm was annexed in 1202, and the Menjukids became an allied local dynasty related to the Konya Seljuks by marriage. The golden age of the Anatolian Seljuk empire followed in the early 13th century. During the first half of their rule, the Anatolian Seljuks did not engage in much construction activity as they contended with military conflicts and were trying to establish themselves. After they attained political stability, they directed more of their energy towards building and developing a unique architectural style. Under the patronage of the Anatolian Seljuks, the Artuqids, and other local dynasties, both indigenous Christian architectural traditions – such as Byzantine, Armenian, and Georgian – and regional Islamic architectural traditions – such as those of Syria, Iraq, Iran, and Central Asia – were synthesized into a highly inventive and original style, with further local variations under some dynasties.

Anatolian Seljuk authority declined after their defeat at the hands of the Mongols in the Battle of Köse Dağ in 1243. In eastern Anatolia the Mongol Ilkhanids ruled indirectly through Seljuk vassals at first, before taking direct control after 1308. Smaller principalities and emirates emerged locally again, known collectively as the Beyliks. Even as the Seljuk empire was weakening in the thirteenth century, their intense building activity did not stop. Despite the decline of Seljuk power, the Seljuk tradition of architecture largely persisted and continued to evolve under new rulers and patrons. The attachment of a large part of Anatolia to the Ilkhanid Empire may have also renewed artistic connections with Iran, the center of that empire. For example, the construction of monumental portals flanked by two minarets is attested in earlier Iranian Seljuk monuments but did not appear in Anatolian Seljuk monuments until after the Mongol conquest. In central and eastern Anatolia, under dynasties like the Karamanids and the Eretnids, architecture remained fairly traditional. In western Anatolia, Turkish principalities such as Saruhanids, the Beylik of Aydın, and the Menteşe Beylik all existed on the Byzantine frontier in a region with many ancient Greek and Roman monuments. As a result, architecture here experimented with both Seljuk elements and Byzantine and Mediterranean traditions. One of the local Turkish dynasties, the Ottomans, eventually went on to establish the Ottoman Empire and developed a style of Ottoman architecture.

Great Seljuk Empire architecture

Major monuments and building types 
The Seljuks developed their own unique building types such as the caravanserai and the madrasa. The most important religious monument from the Great Seljuk period is the Jameh Mosque of Isfahan, which was expanded and modified by various Seljuk patrons in the late 11th century and early 12th century. Two major and innovative domed chambers were added to it in the late 11th century. Four large iwans were then erected around the courtyard around the early 12th century, giving rise to the four-iwan plan. The four-iwan plan revolutionised the form and function of the mosques in the region and introduced new types of buildings involving madrasas and caravanserais which spread through Iran, Anatolia, and Syria. Soon after or around the same time as the work in Isfahan, the four-iwan plan appeared in mosques such as the Jameh Mosque of Zavareh (built circa 1135–1136) and the Jameh Mosque of Ardestan (renovated by a Seljuk vizier in 1158–1160).

Another innovation by the Seljuks was the "kiosk mosque". This usually small edifice is characterised by an unusual plan consisting of a domed hall, standing on arches with three open sides giving it the kiosk character. Furthermore, the minarets constructed by the Seljuks took a new dimension adopting an Iranian preference of cylindrical form featuring elaborate patterns. This style was substantially different from the typical square shaped North African minarets.

In the late 11th century the Seljuk vizier Nizam al-Mulk (in office between 1064 and 1092) created a system of state madrasas called the Niẓāmiyyahs (named after him) in various Seljuk and Abbasid cities ranging from Mesopotamia to Khorasan. Practically none of these madrasas founded under Nizam al-Mulk have survived, though partial remains of one madrasa in Khargerd, Iran, include an iwan and an inscription attributing it to Nizam al-Mulk. Nonetheless, it is clear that the Seljuks constructed many madrasas across their empire within a relatively short period of time, thus spreading both the idea of this institution and the architectural models on which later examples were based. Although madrasa-type institutions appear to have existed in Iran before Nizam al-Mulk, this period is nonetheless considered by many as the starting point for the proliferation of the first formal madrasas across the rest of the Muslim world.

Large caravanserais were built as a way to foster trade and assert Seljuk authority in the countryside. They typically consisted of a building with a fortified exterior appearance, monumental entrance portal, and interior courtyard surrounded by various halls, including iwans. Some notable examples, only partly preserved, are the caravanserais of Ribat-i Malik (c. 1068–1080) and Ribat-i Sharaf (12th century) in Transoxiana and Khorasan, respectively.

The Seljuks also continued to build "tower tombs", an Iranian building type from earlier periods, such as the Toghrul Tower built in Rayy (south of present-day Tehran) in 1139. More innovative, however, was the introduction of mausoleums with a square or polygonal floor plan, which later became a common form of monumental tombs. Early examples of this are the two Kharraqan Mausoleums (1068 and 1093) near Qazvin (northern Iran), which have octagonal forms, and the large Mausoleum of Sanjar (c. 1152) in Merv (present-day Turkmenistan), which has a square base.

Materials and decoration 

The scarcity of wood on the Iranian Plateau led to the prominence of brick as a construction material, particularly high-quality baked bricks. It also encouraged the development and use of vaults and domes to cover buildings, which in turn led to innovations in the methods of structural support for these vaults. The bonding patterns of brickwork were exploited for decorative effect: by combining bricks in different orientations and by alternating between recessed and projecting bricks, different patterns could be achieved. This technique reached its full development during the 11th century. In some cases pieces of glazed tile were inserted into the spaces between bricks to add further color and contrast. The bricks could also be incised with further motifs or to carve inscriptions on the façades of monuments. 

While brick decoration favoured geometric motifs, stucco or plaster was also used to cover some surfaces and this material could be carved with a wider range of vegetal and floral motifs (arabesques). Tilework and color took on increased importance by the late 12th-century and extensive glazed tile decoration appears in multiple 12th-century monuments. This went in hand with a growing trend towards covering walls and large areas with surface decoration that obscured the structure itself. This trend became more pronounced in later Iranian and Central Asian architecture.

The 11th century saw the spread of the muqarnas technique of decoration across the Islamic world, although its exact origins and the manner in which it spread is not fully understood by scholars. Muqarnas was used for vaulting and to accomplish transitions between different structural elements, such as the transition between a square chamber and a round dome (squinches). Examples of early muqarnas squinches are found in Iranian and Central Asian monuments during previous centuries, but deliberate and significant use of fully-developed muqarnas is visible in Seljuk structures such as in the additions to the Friday Mosque in Isfahan.

A traditional sign of the Seljuks used in their architecture was an eight-pointed star that held a philosophic significance, being regarded as the symbol of existence and eternal evolution. Many examples of this Seljuk star can be found in tile work, ceramics and rugs from the Seljuk period and the star has even been incorporated in the state emblem of Turkmenistan. Another typical Seljuk symbol is the ten-fold rosette or the large number of different types of rosettes on Seljuk mihrabs and portals that represent the planets which are, according to old central Asian tradition and shamanistic religious beliefs, symbols of the other world. Examples of this symbol can be found in their architecture.

Anatolian Seljuk architecture

General characteristics 

Anatolian Seljuk architecture is concentrated in major cities of the period such as Konya (their main capital), Kayseri, Sivas, Niğde, and Erzurum, but Seljuk works can be found in almost any major Anatolian town in Central and Eastern Anatolia. Along the coasts, the Seljuks occupied Antalya and Sinop and built a new fortified port at Alanya. Smaller Turkish principalities in Anatolia, such as the Danishmendids and the Saltuqids, were absorbed by the Anatolian Seljuk empire by the late 12th century but they nonetheless also contributed to the architecture of Anatolia during this era. The Zengids and Artuqids, both dynasties which initially served the Great Seljuks and later controlled their own realms, also turned cities like Mosul, Diyarbakir, Hasankeyf, and Mardin into important centers of architectural development that had a long-term influence in the wider regions of Anatolia and Syria.

The Anatolian Seljuks ruled a territory that was multi-ethnic and only newly-settled by Muslims. As a result, their architecture was eclectic and incorporated influences from other cultures. The fluidity of society on the frontier of the Islamic world, along with the fact that the Seljuks enjoyed only a short period of stable rule before the Mongol invasion, prevented them from developing a unified "imperial" style of architecture. While Konya was a vibrant center of patronage in the early 13th century, it did not necessarily impose its own artistic styles on other cities. Instead, architecture across Anatolia was strongly influenced by the creativity of local craftsmen and by mobile workshops of artisans who travelled the region in search of patrons. Seljuk architecture was influenced by Armenian architecture due to the employ of Muslim architects originating from historical Armenia and of Armenian architects and masons. Persian influences also continued to have a strong effect. In general, Seljuk architecture combined forms and techniques from Byzantine, Armenian, and Georgian architecture with those of Iran, Syria, Iraq and Central Asia. The influence of other cultures on the Anatolian Seljuks can also be seen by the use of spolia in their architecture. There are examples of Anatolian Seljuk architecture using spolia material in visible places in public buildings located at the centers and entrances of cities, such as at the Atabey Ertokuş Madrasa in Atabey (Isparta Province). The high quality of spolia in certain cases, combined with prevalent laws that prevented important public buildings from being demolished, contributed to preserving elements of ancient architectural traditions.Most Anatolian Seljuk works are of dressed stone, with brick reserved for minarets. The use of stone in Anatolia is the biggest difference with the Seljuk buildings in Iran, which are made of bricks. This also resulted in more of their monuments being preserved up to modern times. In their construction of caravanserais, madrasas and mosques, the Anatolian Seljuks translated the Iranian Seljuk architecture of bricks and plaster into the use of stone. Decoration in Anatolian Seljuk architecture was concentrated on certain elements like entrance portals, windows, and the mihrabs of mosques. Stone-carving was one of the most accomplished mediums of decoration, with motifs ranging from earlier Iranian stucco motifs to local Byzantine and Armenian motifs. Muqarnas was also used. The madrasas of Sivas and the Ince Minareli Medrese in Konya are among the most notable examples, while the Great Mosque and Hospital complex of Divriği is distinguished by the most extravagant and eclectic high-relief stone decoration around its entrance portals and its mihrab. Syrian-style ablaq striped marble also appears on the entrance portal of the Karatay Medrese and the Alaeddin Mosque in Konya. Although tilework was commonly used in Iran, Anatolian architecture innovated in the use of tile revetments to cover entire surfaces independently of other forms of decoration, as seen in the Karatay Medrese.

The Anatolian Seljuks heavily emphasized hospitality combined with rituals of devotion. These beliefs pushed forth the development of buildings such as caravanserais, Sufi lodges, and other complexes that focused on providing shelter and food to travelers. These buildings showcase the social and political significance of hospitality in the Seljuk countryside. Ibn Battuta, a 14th-century traveler, wrote about this phenomenon in his travelogues. Madrasas were not just used for teaching but also were meant to host various rituals and to provide lodging for guests.  The similar layouts of Sufi lodges and madrasas suggest that both types of structure were used in similar ways for rituals and hospitality. These buildings had to be adaptable to the changing political and social demands during this time. The multiple orientations of the madrasa show their adaptability to changing religious situations. There were also rituals when offering hospitality to guests. The ritual involved first presenting the visitor a meal, then taking the guests to bathe, and later being offered fruit and sweetmeats before listening to the Quran recitation. Sufi lodges served as lively community centers that were connected to the wider world. They showcased the social mobility in Seljuk and the emphasis on comfort and generosity.

Mosques 

Anatolian Seljuk mosque architecture was a combination of Turkish-Islamic culture and Anatolian traditions. The four-iwan plan, developed under the earlier Seljuks in Iran, did not appear in Anatolian Seljuk mosques. The congregational mosques (also known as an Ulu Cami or "great mosque") built by the Anatolian Seljuks included more conservative hypostyle constructions alongside less traditional floor plans. Hypostyle structures had wide halls with rows of columns or pillars supporting the ceiling. Major examples of this include the Great Mosque of Sivas (1197) and the Alaeddin Mosque of Konya (built over multiple periods between 1156 and 1235, with later additions). Most of the twelfth-century great mosques in both the southeastern and northeastern regions of the Seljuq empire place a dome in front of the mihrab. The minarets of Seljuk mosques were built of stone or brick, usually resting on a stone base, and typically had a cylindrical or polygonal shaft that is less slender than later Ottoman minarets. They were sometimes embellished with decorative brickwork or glazed ceramic decoration up the level of their balconies.

The smallest type of mosque is the mescid (from Arabic masjid). It was developed during the thirteenth century in central Anatolia and was composed of a square chamber topped by a dome. This type of mosque could be a freestanding structure or it could be integrated into a larger building. Another type of small mosque is the citadel mosque, or kale mescidi, which was developed in eastern Turkey during the twelfth century. These citadel mosques had more involved plans compared to other small mosques, with an interior divided into several aisles that were covered with barrel-vaults and cross-vaults. Examples of this type are the citadel mosques in Divriği (1180–1181) and Erzurum (12th century).

"Basilical"-type mosques were also built, so-called because they have a more linear layout with their long axis aligned with the mihrab and the qibla (direction of prayer). This type has its antecedents in the citadel mosques of the 12th century and may have been influenced by local church architecture. More developed examples occur in the 13th century, such as the Alaeddin Mosque of Niğde (1223), which has three "naves" running length-wise towards the qibla wall and three domes covering the bays in front of this wall. The Burmali Minare Mosque and Gök Madrasa Mosque, both built in Amasya in the 13th century, also have basilical plans but in these cases the three domes are placed in a line over the central nave perpendicular to the qibla wall. The placement of domes in this fashion accentuated the existing tradition of placing a dome in front of the mihrab.

The Great Mosque of Divriği (1228–1229) has a layout that can be described as either hypostyle or basilical. It consists of three naves, with the central nave in front of the mihrab being wider than the others. A dome covers a square bay in front of the mihrab and another dome pierced with an oculus covers the bay in the middle of the mosque. Similar features can be found in the Mosque of Hunat Hatun (or Huand Hatun) in Kayseri, which is part of a larger complex dating to 1237–1238. This mosque has a central nave which is emphasized by two domes (one in front of the mihrab and another in the middle of the mosque) but has a larger number of naves or aisles. The side naves run parallel to the qibla wall and perpendicular to the central nave. The dome in the middle of the mosque is a 19th-century construction covering what was originally small court open to the sky. The same arrangement with two domes, one of which was originally a small open court, is found in the Great Mosque (Ulu Cami) of Kayseri, which was founded in 1135 by the Danishmendids but restored and modified multiple times in later centuries, including by the Seljuks in 1205–1206.

The "wooden" mosque, a variation of the hypostyle mosque with wooden columns and ceilings, emerged in western central Anatolia in the 13th century. The earliest example is the Great Mosque of Sivrihisar (1232), while other examples are the Great Mosque of Afyonkarahisar (1272) and the Arslanhane Mosque in Ankara (c. 1290). The most accomplished example is the Eşrefoğlu Mosque in Beyşehir, built in 1297 by the Eshrefids, a short-lived Beylik dynasty. The wooden columns in some of these mosques are ornately-carved. These timber posts might have been influenced by the past of Central Asiatic Turks and their large tents held up by similarly carved wooden posts.

In southeastern Anatolia, under the control of Artuqid dynasties, the influence of existing Syrian architecture and mosques was more dominant. One of the most notable monuments here is the Great Mosque of Diyarbakir. It was originally founded in the 7th century but rebuilt by the Artuqids in the 12th century. It is similar in form to the Umayyad Mosque of Damascus and its ornate courtyard façades reuse Classical Roman elements alongside Islamic motifs. Another important Artuqid mosque in the region is the congregational mosque begun in 1204 in Kızıltepe (also known as Dunaysir or Koçhisar), which has a similar layout and is notable for the ornate stone-carving of its mihrab. Later on, under the Beyliks, mosque architecture was more diverse, with examples like the Saruhanid congregational mosque (Ulu Cami) in Manisa (1371), the Isa Bey Mosque in Selçuk (1374), and the İlyas Bey Mosque in Miletus (1404). As the years went on, there was increasing emphasis on the domed area in front of the mihrab, eventually culminating in the domed mosques of Ottoman architecture.

Madrasas and hospitals 
Numerous madrasas were built. Architecturally, they consisted mainly of two types. One type, similar to those of Iran and Mesopotamia, was centered around an open courtyard which was bordered by a varying number of iwans (with at least one iwan situated along the axis of the entrance). In these madrasas the decoration was concentrated around a monumental entrance portal. The Çifte Minareli Medrese (c. 1250 or 1253) in Erzurum is one of the earliest examples of an entrance portal surmounted by twin minarets. The Gök Medrese (1271–1272) in Sivas is another rich monument in a similar form, which was erected the same year as two other open-court madrasas in the same city, the Çifte Minareli Medrese (only partly preserved) and the Buruciye Medrese. The Ak Medrese in Niğde (1404) is a very late example of this form built by the Karamanids, an emirate contemporary with the early Ottomans, although it is distinguished by a loggia of ogive arches along the second story of its façade.

The second type of madrasa, which was particular to Anatolia, was a smaller madrasa with a central court covered by a dome or vault. These were especially characteristic of Konya, exemplified by the Karatay Medrese and Ince Minareli Medrese. The Yakutiye Medrese in Erzurum is also a later example of this type, built in 1310 under the Ilkhanids. Its interior is roofed with multiple vaults and at the center of the hall is a square muqarnas vault culminating in a small lantern.

Hospitals (also known as a darüşşifa) were also built in many cities and usually followed the layout of madrasas. The Çifte or "Double" Madrasa in Kayseri (c. 1205) was co-founded by Kaykhusraw I and his sister Gevher Nesibe Hatun and consists of two open-air courtyard buildings, a medical school (madrasa) and a hospital, which are joined together. The Şifaiye Medrese built by Izz al-Din Kayka'us I in Sivas (1217–1218) was a hospital and consists of an open courtyard building with an integrated tomb for the founder. The Divriği Hospital, part of a larger mosque complex, resembles a madrasa with roofed courtyard.

Tombs 
Tombs, which often accompanied madrasas or mosques, were most commonly of the polygonal (most commonly octagonal) or circular type with a conical roof, although there were variations. The tomb of Sultan Kiliç Arslan II, located in the courtyard of the Alaeddin Mosque and built around 1190, is decagonal rather than octagonal. The Tomb of Emir Saltuq in Erzurum, built around the same time (late 12th century), has an octagonal lower and a cylindrical upper section. The Döner Kümbet, a dodecagonal tomb in Kayseri (c. 1275), and the later Hudavend Hatun Tomb in Niğde (1312) are richly decorated with stone-carved motifs including muqarnas and figurative images. The Mausoleum of Mama Hatun in Tercan (early 13th century) is an exceptional example in which the tomb structure is surrounded by a circular enclosing wall, which has its own decorated entrance portal. The Tomb of Sitte Melik (or of Shahin Shah) in Divriği, built before 1197, has one of the oldest muqarnas-decorated entrance portals in Anatolian Islamic architecture. The Tomb of Izz al-Din Kayka'us I, which is integrated into the Şifaiye Medrese he commissioned in Sivas, is notable for its façade of brick and tile decoration facing the building's courtyard and its octagonal pointed cupola that rises above the surrounding structure.

Caravanserais 
Some of the most impressive Seljuk monuments were caravanserais built along many trade routes between cities. Hundreds of them were built in the 13th century. Only about a hundred of the caravanserais exist today in varying states of preservation. Several are mostly intact or have been restored. Enough remains of these caravanserais to establish both plan and superstructure. Unfortunately, the majority of caravanserais had no founding inscription or it has since been destroyed. The majority of Seljuk caravanserais were built between 1220 and 1250, which was the height of the Seljuk empire. Seljuk caravanserais are unique in plan and design. However, they do take inspiration from Iranian and Armenian architecture that came before. Providing safety and shelter were the basic function of caravanserais and can be seen in the thick stone masonry walls with only one entrance and slit windows. This single entrance controlled access and was also closed off at night. The roofs of caravanserais were also occasionally used for defense with room set up with advantageous views of the road. Most of the walls have buttresses and are topped with crenellation. These buildings are constructed with large stone ashlars and with conical roofs on tall drums. They are also often adorned with floral and geometric motifs. Seljuqk caravanserais have one covered hall and a small open courtyard both rectangular in shape. The entry leads into the open courtyard and is the most prevalent part of the structure. After going through the open courtyard, people can enter the covered hall. The covered hall consists of several aisles of columns and centered with a lantern dome. Seljuk caravanserais had a plain curtain wall with little decoration. The entire ornamentation was focused on the main entry portal.

Shelter was the essential function of the caravanserais. Therefore, these structures had stables for the animals, places for packing and unpacking goods, and lodgings for travelers. The shelter galleries were composed of two parallel bands at two different levels. The lower band on ground level housed the stables and the upper band was a platform that housed the goods and people. These different levels maintained differing degrees of cleanliness, as it separated the animals and people. Many caravanserais also had water systems, including drainage and sewage in the building. These buildings were meant to encourage trade in the Seljuq empire. They were constructed on the principal trade lines and catered to travelers from around the world. Caravanserais served multiple purposes such as military uses, government houses for the sultan and his retinue, and royal guesthouses for visiting monarchs. They also were used as prisons, places of refuge, and for religious purposes. These buildings offered meals, shelter, medical care, bathing, and other such services to all types of travelers. Most of these structures also included a mosque or at least a space to perform religious rituals. The types of service and amount of space that the service areas occupied varied a lot. No two caravanserais had exactly the same plan. They were all unique even if they provided the same services.

Some caravanserais were simple rectangular buildings with no courtyard, consisting of a hall with vaulted aisles. One example, the Alayhan caravanserai, possibly built by Kiliç Arslan II around 1190, features one of the oldest muqarnas-decorated portals in Anatolian Islamic architecture. Another example is the Susuz Han (c. 1246) on the road between Antalya and Burdur, although its lack of a courtyard may be due to an unfinished construction or to a later demolition. Others caravanserais consist of a large courtyard surrounded by roofed arcades but without a large roofed hall. There are relatively few examples of this type, including the Evdir Han (1215–1219) and the Kırkgöz Han (possibly built between 1237 and 1246), both also located on the Antalya–Burdur road.

The most monumental caravanserais combined both of these types, with major examples including the Sultan Han on the Konya–Aksaray road (1229), the Sultan Han near Kayseri (1236–1237), the Ağzıkara Han northeast of Aksaray (completed in 1240), and the Karatay Han east of Kayseri (completed circa 1240). They have a fortress-like exterior appearance with semi-round bastions and an entrance portal of decorated carved stone leading to an open-air inner courtyard. In the center of these courtyards there is sometimes a small cubic prayer room raised above the ground on four pillars. On the opposite side of the entrance another portal led to a covered hall with many aisles running perpendicular to a central aisle with a central dome.

Fortifications and palaces 

Among the Seljuk military fortifications, one of the best preserved examples is an ensemble of 13th-century structures in the coastal town of Alanya, which includes walls, a seaside tower or bastion (Kızıl Kule), and a naval arsenal or shipyard (tersane). In southeastern Anatolia, the city of Diyarbakir has preserved significant parts of its defensive walls. The walls date from various periods but they feature several towers built by the Artuqids, which are decorated with a mix of calligraphic inscriptions and figurative images of animals and mythological creatures carved in stone.

Little has survived of Seljuk palaces, which in some cases were built inside citadels. In Konya, the Seljuk royal palace and citadel once stood next to the Alaeddin Mosque on the hill overlooking the centre of the city. Only parts of one of its pavilions, the Alaeddin Köşkü or Alaeddin Kiosk, have been preserved. This pavilion was built by Kiliç Arslan II (r. 1156–1192) on top of one of the citadel's towers. Other palaces are no longer standing but in some cases have been excavated and documented. The Kaykubadiye or Kayqubadiyya was a summer palace built near Kayseri by Ala' al-Din Kayqubadh (r. 1220–1237). It consisted of three small buildings built around an artificial lake, including a mosque, a boathouse, and another structure with two rooms and tile decoration. The Kubadabad Palace was another summer palace built by the same sultan on the shores of Lake Beyşehir. It consisted of 16 small buildings enclosed by a fortified wall, including residential units decorated with tiles.

Bridges 

In Anatolia, both the Seljuks and Artuqids built numerous bridges across rivers. The most common type of bridge was the single-span bridge with a pointed arch shape, or one in which the main span was a large pointed arch. An early example of this is the Malabadi Bridge (1147) built by the Artuqids over the Batman River east of Silvan. This form of bridge existed already in Roman and Byzantine times and it continued to be employed in the later Ottoman period (e.g. the famous Mostar bridge). For shallower rivers with weaker currents, flatter multi-arch bridges could be more practical. An example of this is the Dicle Bridge, the oldest Islamic-era bridge in Anatolia, which was built over the Tigris River in 1065–1067. This type of bridge became common during the Beylik period and also continued to be built under the Ottomans. Another notable bridge and early Turkish/Islamic-era bridge in Anatolia is the ruined Old Bridge in Hasankeyf, built by the Artuqids between 1155 and 1175, notable for its tall massive piers and instances of figurative decoration.

Stonework imagery 
Islamic cultures used figural representations in their art but less commonly in religious contexts. The Anatolaian Seljuks and the neighbouring Artuqids were unprecedented in their prolific use of these motifs and employed them even in their religious art and architecture. One key way in which figures were represented in Seljuk architecture is through stone reliefs. The Seljuks displayed these artforms on their doorways, the most noticeable of places. This practice can be traced to the Christian-Armenian tradition and was adopted by the Seljuks with their conquest of the region. This type of stonework was used on profane and religious buildings and on fortifications like city walls, often on doorways, gates and entrances. This tradition of figural imagery eventually declined after the region came under Ilkhanid domination.

Human motifs 
Human motifs were rarely used in Seljuk architecture. When they were used, they were often displayed in groups or pairs using a mirrored arrangement. Examples of this include the Alaeddin Mosque in Niğde and on the gate of the hospital in the Great Mosque complex of Divriği. This type of imagery was  related to the Seljuks belief in astrology and depicted astrological and planetary symbols on the stonework. Infrequently, they would depict specific human figures, as seen in another on the gate of the Divriği hospital. This example is thought to be a portrait of a specific person rather than of planetary figures.

Lions 
Animal motifs were the most utilized type of imagery in the Seljuk Empire and a favorite included the lion. They were typically depicted in full relief, were used as gargoyles, and had a similar style to traditional Armenian lion sculptures. Like the human motifs, the use of the lion imagery is often associated with the zodiac symbol for the sun. Examples include the lion reliefs on the Çifte Medrese of Kayseri, two reliefs of a lion fighting a bull at the Great Mosque of Diyarbakir, and reliefs of lions with the tree of life and a crescent moon shape at the Döner Kümbet tomb in Kayseri.

Eagles / birds of prey 

Often linked to tombs, bird of prey reliefs had varied uses and meanings to the Seljuks. The eagle was originally a symbol of the Oghuz, a Turkish tribe that the Seljuks originated from, thus linking the usage and tradition of this symbol to pre-Islamic Central Asia. This symbol was most often used on tombs and mausoleums, showing the belief that birds were a type of heavenly guide. Examples of eagle reliefs are found on the Tomb of Emir Saltuq in Erzurum and the Tomb of Hudavend Hatun in Niğde.

While the eagle is typically shown on structures relating to death, the double-headed eagle had a more complex meaning and is traditionally shown on more sacred architecture. They are depicted as fierce animals, like the lions, and are thought to be a protective motif (this is especially felt when they are displayed on non-sacred structures, like city walls and palaces). Sometimes these birds were hybridized with other threatening animals, like dragons. When used on mausoleums and tombs, double-headed birds are connected to the single bird of prey meaning and are thought of as soul-birds. Examples of the double-headed eagle motif as a symbol of power are found on the Artuqid towers of the Diyarbakir city walls. They also appear in the western entrance portal of the Great Mosque of Divriği against a background of arabesques, and on the Döner Kümbet in Kayseri above the tree of life.

Dragon 
Showing up rarely in sacred Seljuk architecture, the dragon motif is more commonly used on profane buildings, like city walls and palaces. No matter where the dragons were shown, they were almost always arranged in pairs and facing each other, as if to fight. The Seljuk dragons had vicious heads with open mouths, and a twisted, knotted, or snake-like body and tail. Sometimes they had wings and sometimes they were shown with horns. This type of imagery is closely linked to early Chinese dragons, where similarly twisted and ferocious dragons were displayed above tomb doorways. The dragon was often hybridized with other animals to give those symbols a fierce and protective appearance. When used in sacred structures, the dragon is also linked to the zodiac and the pseudo-planet Jawzahar; its head and tail are thought to represent the ascending and descending nodes of the moon. Examples of carved dragon reliefs include a pair of mirrored dragons on the entrance façade of the Çifte Minareli Medrese in Erzurum and another pair confronting each other on the arches of the kiosk mosque in the center of the Sultan Han near Kayseri.

Siren 

A mythical female creature, sirens are thought to ward off evil and were often displayed with crowns, fish tails, and occasionally wings. They were often depicted in hybridized forms. Sirens were also significant to the zodiac themes the Seljuks often portrayed, with sirens frequently representing the Gemini. The use of sirens in the Anatolian region dates to pre-Seljuk eras, with influence from Egyptian textiles and art from the 7th and 8th centuries and Turfan textiles from the 6th and 7th centuries. Examples of siren images can be found on the Tomb of Hudavend Hatun and on the tiles of the Kubadabad Palace.

Sphinx 
Common in profane Seljuk architecture but rare in sacred buildings, the sphinx is another mythical creature the Seljuks utilized on their structures and art objects. An example of a sphinx relief on a structure, although deteriorated, can be found on the Döner Kümbet. The sphinx was thought to ward off evil and had protective characteristics, thus was most commonly used on city walls and palaces. This function is also evident in the image of a sphinx protecting a hero in battle carved on a tombstone housed at the Archaeological Museum of Afyonkarahisar. The sphinx also has a zodiac and planetary implication as well; the "Sphinx Wheel" motif, which appears on the "Wade cup" from Seljuk Iran (kept at the Cleveland Museum of Art), shows the creature symbolizing the sun in its rising position, peak, and setting position. The Sphinx, already and hybrid creature, was also frequently hybridized with the various other animal motifs in Seljuk architecture.

Animal cycle (zodiac) 

In conjunction with the 12-month zodiac, the Seljuks were also interested in the Chinese Zodiac, a 12-year cycle where each year is assigned an animal (Rat, Ox, Tiger, Rabbit, Dragon, Snake, Horse, Goat, Monkey, Rooster, Dog, and Pig). The Seljuks adopted these motifs and utilized them through relief work on several mausoleums, and, during the later Seljuk period under Mongol domination, this type of work was produced even more. Examples of it are seen on the Tomb of Emir Saltuq, on a tomb belonging to the Sultan Han near Kayseri, and on the Gök Medrese in Sivas.

Minbars 
The minbar (often translated as "pulpit") is one of the only consistently present furnishings in mosques. They consisted of a short straight staircase, usually with a set of doors at the bottom and a small kiosk-like structure at the top. Anatolian minbars during the Seljuk era, as well as up to early Ottoman times, were made of wood and were decorated with deeply-carved arabesque motifs and geometric patterns. In overall form and style they resembled contemporary minbars in Syria and the Levant, although they lacked the muqarnas at the top of Syrian minbars.

The most accomplished Turkish minbars of this period were made with the kündekâri technique, in which many interlocking pieces of wood were held together without the use of nails, pins, or glue. These pieces were fitted together like a mosaic and supported by an internal wooden frame. Examples of such minbars include the minbar of the Alaeddin Mosque in Konya (dated to 1155–6, before the mosque's many later restorations), the minbars of the congregational mosques (Ulu Camis) of Malatya and Siirt (both from the 13th century and both now housed at the Ethnography Museum of Ankara), the minbar of the Great Mosque of Sivirhisar (1275), and the minbar of the Eşrefoğlu Mosque (1297–9). This style of minbar continued to be used in Anatolian mosques during the Beyliks period and up to the early Ottoman period. In this later period the carvings became shallower, the geometric mosaic arrangement of wooden pieces became more intricate, and projecting bosses were sometimes added to the decoration. Examples of this later period include the minbar of the Saruhanid Great Mosque of Manisa (1376) and the minbar of the Ottoman Great Mosque of Bursa (1499).

As the kündekâri method required great skill and labour, some minbars were made with simpler wooden boards which were carved with decoration made to imitate the kündekâri style and then mounted on a frame. The disadvantage of this method was that over time the wooden boards could warp and shrink, resulting in the motifs being interrupted or misaligned from one board to another. Examples of such minbars include the minbar of the Great Mosque of Divriği (1228–9) and the minbar of the Arslanhane Mosque at Ankara (1289–90). The simpler technique notwithstanding, they are still considered fine examples of Seljuk Anatolian woodwork and craftsmanship.

See also
List of Seljuk hans and kervansarays in Turkey
Turkish art

References

Bibliography

 
Islamic architecture
Architecture in Turkey
Architecture in Iran
Architectural history